Philippine Airlines Flight 137 was a scheduled passenger flight from Manila's Ninoy Aquino International Airport to Bacolod City Domestic Airport.

Accident 
On March 22, 1998, flight 137 overshot the runway while landing at Bacolod City Domestic Airport. There were no fatalities among the aircraft's crew and passengers, but three people died on the ground as the airliner plowed through a residential area.

The aircraft, an Airbus A320-214, tail number RP-C3222, was destroyed. It had been in service for barely three months prior to the accident.

A selection by the pilot of the wrong mode on the onboard flight computers prevented power from being reduced to idle, which inhibited thrust reverse and spoilers from being used. The offending engine was shut down, and brakes applied, but the aircraft was unable to stop before the end of the runway.

See also 

 TAM Airlines Flight 3054 – Another A320 that crashed nine years later under almost identical circumstances, with 199 fatalities.
 Korean Air Flight 631 – another runway excursion incident in the Philippines which happened 24 years later.
 Runway excursion

References

External links 
Final accident report (Alternate) (Archive)
Video of the crash site from Associated Press Archive

Aviation accidents and incidents in the Philippines
Aviation accidents and incidents in 1998
Airliner accidents and incidents caused by pilot error
137
Accidents and incidents involving the Airbus A320
History of Negros Occidental
1998 disasters in the Philippines
March 1998 events in Asia
Airliner accidents and incidents involving runway overruns